Nolan E. Williams Jr. is an American composer, musicologist, and producer. He was an editor of the African American Heritage Hymnal.

Early life and education
Williams grew up the son, grandson and great-grandson of Baptist ministers.  At the age of 4, he heard the song Lean on Me played by the choir at his father’s church. After the service he asked one of the musicians to play the song for him again on the piano. At home, Williams went to the family’s piano and, with no formal lessons, he sounded out the notes until he could play the song himself.  Williams' first piano teacher was his great-aunt Daisy Marie Young.

Williams attended St. John’s College High School in Washington, D.C. In 1990 he received a B.A. in Music (piano performance) from Oberlin College, and in 1993 he received a Master of Divinity degree in Theology from Howard University.

Book publications
As a musicologist, Williams is best known as the Music Editor of the African American Heritage Hymnal, which he began work on in 1993. Working with co-editor Dr. Delores Carpenter, pastor of Michigan Park Christian Church in Washington, D.C., the hymnal took nine years to compile. The 2001 publication included 575 hymnals, spirituals and gospel songs. Noted musicologist, Dr. Wyatt Tee Walker, wrote in the book's foreword that the publication was "the most important addition to Protestant hymnody within the past century." Williams created new arrangements for 92 songs in the book.  African American Heritage Hymnal has sold more than 500,000 copies worldwide.

In 1995, Williams' commentary on the Book of Habakkuk was included in the collection Many Voices: Multicultural Responses to the Minor Prophets written by Howard University School of Divinity students.

NEWorks Productions
Much of Williams’ musical career has been conducted under the umbrella of NEWorks Productions, an arts programming and music production organization that he founded in 2003.  He is also the music director of NEWorks Voices of America [NVoA], formerly called NEWorks’ Voices of Inspiration choir, a choral aggregation specializing in African-American Sacred Music.   Since 2007, the choir has performed at a variety of nationally televised events, with multiple performances at the White House, including the National Christmas Tree Lighting in 2013.

Selected works and performances
Williams has composed, arranged or played music for dozens of albums in the gospel and jazz genres, including albums by Ed Wiley, Jr., Lamar Campbell, and Regina Belle.  In 2008 he released InSpiration, an original album of worship music.

In 2014, a recording of We Shall Overcome arranged by Williams and featuring mezzo-soprano Denyce Graves was among several works of art, including the poem A Brave and Startling Truth by Maya Angelou, were sent to space on the first test flight of the spacecraft Orion.

In 2017, Williams premiered Hold Fast to Dreams, a commissioned work honoring the legacy of Philadelphia native and NASA astronaut Col. Guion S. Bluford Jr., inspired by the Langston Hughes poem, Dreams.

In July 2018, Williams led a group of local choirs in performing the National Anthem at the 2018 Major League Baseball All Star Game at Nationals Park in Washington, D.C.

In celebration of composer Leonard Bernstein’s 100 birthday, Williams commissioned the re-working of Leonard Bernstein’s Mass by four Philadelphia composers – Jay Fluellen, Ruth Naomi Floyd, Rollo Dilworth, and Evelyn Simpson. Williams tasked them to “collectively write a new version that expresses their faith or crisis of faith”.  The new piece premiered at Philadelphia’s Monumental Baptist Church in August 2018.

Theatrical productions

External links
 Official website: NolanWilliamsJr.com 
 Nolan Williams music credits
 List of selected hymns Nolan Williams Jr. has arranged

References

1969 births
20th-century African-American musicians
21st-century African-American musicians
African-American composers
African-American conductors (music)
African-American male composers
African-American pianists
American male conductors (music)
American music arrangers
Howard University alumni
Living people
Oberlin College alumni